The International School Ho Chi Minh City - American Academy (ISHCMC - American Academy) is an international school for middle and high school children aged 11 to 18 years old in Ho Chi Minh City, Vietnam. ISHCMC - American Academy is one of three schools in Vietnam under the school's group Cognita, along with the International School Ho Chi Minh City and International School Saigon Pearl.

American Curriculum 

ISHCMC - American Academy delivers a full American curriculum under the American Education Reaches Out (AERO) framework, which is aligned closely with U.S. national standards across math, science, English, and social studies. All students from Grades 6 to 12 take the U.S. Measures of Academic Progress (MAP) standardized assessments in English, Reading, and Math twice a year.

English Language 
ISHCMC - American Academy teaches in the English curriculum and has an English as an Additional Language (EAL) Program for students whose English is not their first language. The EAL program is based on the WIDA framework and assessments, which progresses students through 6 stages of the language acquisition process until they reach a proficiency level equivalent to that of a native speaker. In 2015, over 60% of students achieved above the worldwide standards in their English MAP® tests.

ICT Program 
ISHCMC - American Academy's Information and Communications Technology (ICT) Program aims to educate students to use technology confidently, responsibly and constructively. An on-site Video Production Suite, equipped with a professional green screen, studio lighting, and the latest audio-visual system, allows students to explore filmography and video editing skills while developing their journalism and English communication skills. ISHCMC - American Academy's 1:1 laptop program equips students with the innovative skills for effective communication, research, and individual project management. Technology is also integrated across the curriculum, with lessons enhanced through the use of Promethean Smart Boards, access to two computer labs and electronic research tools.

University Preparation 

One of the hallmarks of the education program at ISHCMC - American Academy is its focus on preparing students for future success at local and overseas universities.

Syracuse University Project Advance 
ISHCMC - American Academy is the only school in Vietnam to offer early university credit through the Syracuse University Project Advance (SUPA). Through this partnership, ISHCMC - American Academy students can take university-level courses that use the same syllabi, materials, textbooks, assignments and assessments as courses offered at Syracuse University. Successful completion of SUPA courses and examinations earns ISHCMC - American Academy students early university credit while still in high school, saving both time and money in their tertiary education. SUPA students at ISHCMC - American Academy also graduate with two transcripts: an American high school diploma and a SUPA transcript.

University Counseling Program 
ISHCMC - American Academy has a free University Counseling Program, where a professional university counselor schedules regular meetings with students to help them achieve their university goals. The university counselor coordinates university tours, assists with university selection and university applications, and reveals avenues for financial aid. In their final year at ISHCMC – American Academy, all 12th grade students also take part in a week-long intensive University Boot Camp to work on their university applications. To support this program, students have access to an on-site University Counseling Suite equipped with resources and tools needed to tackle the university admissions process.

Advanced Placement Program 
ISHCMC – American Academy students can take university-level courses through the Advanced Placement (AP) Program. More than 90% of the four-year colleges and universities in the U.S. have an AP policy that grants incoming students credit, placement or both for qualifying AP Exam scores.

References

International schools in Vietnam
Cognita
High schools in Ho Chi Minh City
International schools in Ho Chi Minh City